The enzyme inositol-1,4-bisphosphate 1-phosphatase (EC 3.1.3.57) catalyzes the reaction

1D-myo-inositol 1,4-bisphosphate + H2O  1D-myo-inositol 4-phosphate + phosphate

This enzyme belongs to the family of hydrolases, specifically those acting on phosphoric monoester bonds.  The systematic name is D-myo-inositol-1,4-bisphosphate 1-phosphohydrolase. This enzyme is also called inositol-polyphosphate 1-phosphatase.  This enzyme participates in inositol phosphate metabolism and phosphatidylinositol signaling system.

Structural studies

References

 
 
 

EC 3.1.3
Enzymes of known structure